Arthur Yager (October 29, 1858 – December 24, 1941) served as the governor of Puerto Rico from 1913 to 1921.

Biography

Yager was born in Campbellsburg in Henry County, Kentucky. He earned bachelor's and master's degrees from Georgetown College in Kentucky, and a doctorate from Johns Hopkins University. Yager then became a professor of history, economics, and politics at Georgetown College while becoming active in politics. He served as President of Georgetown College from 1908 to 1913.

In 1913, President Woodrow Wilson, a fellow Democrat who had been a classmate of Yager's when both attended Johns Hopkins University, appointed Yager to the governorship of Puerto Rico.  During Yager's administration, and with his support, the United States Congress adopted the Jones-Shafroth Act (also called Jones Act) of 1917, which conferred United States citizenship on Puerto Ricans.

Yager served as governor until Wilson's presidency expired.  He was succeeded by Emmet Montgomery Reily, an appointee of President Warren G. Harding.  Yager returned to Kentucky, where he died in Pewee Valley at the age of 83.

A collection of Yager's correspondence from his time as Governor is archived at the Filson Historical Society in Louisville, Kentucky and open for research.

References
.
.
.

External links

 Yager Collection at Georgetown College
 Filson Historical Society Newsmagazine, Vol.6, No.3

1858 births
1941 deaths
People from Henry County, Kentucky
Kentucky Democrats
Governors of Puerto Rico
Presidents of Georgetown College (Kentucky)
Georgetown College (Kentucky) faculty
Georgetown College (Kentucky) alumni
Johns Hopkins University alumni